Diplacrum is a genus of flowering plants belonging to the family Cyperaceae.

Its native range is Tropics and Subtropics.

Species:

Diplacrum africanum 
Diplacrum capitatum 
Diplacrum caricinum 
Diplacrum exiguum 
Diplacrum guianense 
Diplacrum mitracarpoides 
Diplacrum poklei 
Diplacrum pygmaeopsis 
Diplacrum pygmaeum 
Diplacrum reticulatum

References

Cyperaceae
Cyperaceae genera